The 2017–18 FC Arsenal Tula season was the club's second season back in the Russian Premier League, the highest tier of association football in Russia, since relegation at the end of the 2014–15 season, and their third in total. They finished the season in seventh position and were knocked out of the Russian Cup by FC Tambov at the Round of 32 stage.

Squad

Out on loan

Transfers

Summer

In:

Out:

Winter

In:

Out:

Friendlies

Competitions

Russian Premier League

Results by round

Results

League table

Russian Cup

Squad statistics

Appearances and goals

|-
|colspan="14"|Players away from the club on loan:
|-
|colspan="14"|Players who left Arsenal Tula during the season:

|}

Goal scorers

Disciplinary record

References

External links

FC Arsenal Tula seasons
Arsenal Tula